V13 may refer to :
 Venice 13, a Mexican American street gang based in the Oakwood neighborhood of Venice, a section of Los Angeles, California

V13 may refer to :
 Motorola Razr3, Motorola V13(Razr3), Motorola 3G CDMA Dual screen flip touchscreen phone

V-13 may refer to :
 V-13 trailer, an upgraded version of the K-36 trailer